Yahia Boushaki Boulevard is a main boulevard in the city of Thénia of the Boumerdès Province within Algeria.

Name 

This boulevard is named after the captain Yahia Boushaki who was born in Thénia in 1935 and fell on the field of honor in the village of Souakria near Meftah on December 28, 1960.

He is a native of the village of Soumâa (Thala Oufella) in the Zouaoua Aarch of Aïth Aïcha in the mountains of Khachna.

Yahia Boushaki was a political commissar of the National Liberation Front (FLN) and the soldier officer of the National Liberation Army (ALN), in the historical Wilaya IV during the Algerian War.

He crossed the Kabylie maquis from Lakhdaria to the border of Mitidja near Larbaâ.

Location 
The Jean Colonna d'Ornano Boulevard in the city of Thénia was renamed after the independence of Algeria in 1962 as the Yahia Boushaki Boulevard.

This road begins in the north at Louis Pasteur Avenue, which runs through the hospital of Thénia.

Charles Lavigerie Street cuts this road in the middle near the courtyard of Thénia.

It ends in the south by the stairs that lead to Thénia Railways Station.

Characteristics

This road is straight, oriented from north to south from Thénia hospital to the railway station of the same town.

It is located at an altitude of about 320 meters in the ravine that separates the southern flank of the Boukhanfar mountain from the northern flank of the Soumâa mountain.

This position gives this avenue to be a corridor of the wind blowing from the Mediterranean, and allows residents to fully appreciate the sunsets and sunrises.

The boulevard's carriageway is 5 meters wide, while each of the two sidewalks is 3 meters wide, which gives it considerable pedestrian fluidity.

The western sidewalk is planted with mulberry trees evenly spaced 4 meters apart, while the eastern sidewalk is planted with similarly spaced ash trees.

Notable people

Several Algerian personalities have resided in the houses of this boulevard, like:
 Mohamed Boumerdassi
 Nadia Boumerdassi
 Noureddine Melikechi

Establishments 
This boulevard connects several public establishments in the town of Thénia:

Connections

This boulevard crosses several public roads in the town of Thénia:

See also
 Yahia Boushaki (Shahid)
 Thénia

External links 

 
 Yahia Boushaki Boulevard - Wikimapia.org
 Yahia Boushaki Boulevard - Bing.com
 Yahia Boushaki Boulevard - Maps7.com
 Yahia Boushaki Boulevard - Openstreetmap.org

References

Roads in Algeria
Thénia